{{DISPLAYTITLE:C15H10O4}}
The chemical formula C15H10O4 (molar mass: 254.24 g/mol, exact mass: 254.0579 u) may refer to:

 Chrysin, a flavone
 Chrysophanic acid
 Daidzein, an isoflavone
 4',7-Dihydroxyflavone, a flavone
 7,8-Dihydroxyflavone, a flavone
 Hispidol (6,4'-Dihydroxyaurone), an aurone
 Rubiadin, an anthraquinone